Middleton Joseph Blackwell was a Anglo-Irish soldier and businessman.

Early Life 

Middleton was born in Windsor, Berkshire in August 1913. He was the only child of William Gordon and Irene Blackwell (O'Malley), the daughter of Middleton Moore O'Malley JP. 

Educated at St John's Beaumont School and at Royal Military Academy Sandhurst (1931-33).

Career 
In 1933 he became a captain in the Household Division of the Irish Guards. In 1934 he met Blanche Lindo, who he would marry two years later. 

He was a major in The Jamaica Regiment and a French Liaison Officer with the Allied forces in Vienna between 1939-49.

He was a director of J. Wray and Nephew Ltd. and Lindo Brothers & Co. between 1937-1947 and White Beach Ltd. (Bermuda) 1947-49. 

In 1948, he became the import/sales manager for Western Division of Crosse & Blackwell and James Keiller & Son until the company was acquired by Nestlé in 1960. In 1959, he became president of Blackwell-Young Fancy Food Brokers and vice-president of Kehe Foods.

From 1988-89 he was the Chieftain of the O’Malley Clan.

Personal Life 
In 1936 he married Blanche Blackwell.  The couple had one child, Chris Blackwell, but divorced in 1949.  

He remarried to Edith Behr later that year and had two daughters: Aileen Nina and Edith Leslie.

References

1913 births
1993 deaths
20th-century Anglo-Irish people
20th-century English businesspeople
20th-century Irish businesspeople
British food industry businesspeople
Businesspeople in the drink industry
English expatriates in Ireland
English soldiers
Irish soldiers